Euphorbia adenopoda is a species of plant in the family Euphorbiaceae. It is endemic to Madagascar.  Its natural habitats are subtropical or tropical moist lowland forests and subtropical or tropical moist montane forests. It is threatened by habitat loss.

References

Endemic flora of Madagascar
adenopoda
Least concern plants
Taxa named by Henri Ernest Baillon
Taxonomy articles created by Polbot
Flora of the Madagascar lowland forests
Flora of the Madagascar subhumid forests